Changlang North is one of the 60 Legislative Assembly constituencies of Arunachal Pradesh state in India. It is in Changlang district and is reserved for candidates belonging to the Scheduled Tribes.

Members of the Legislative Assembly

Election results

2019

See also
List of constituencies of Arunachal Pradesh Legislative Assembly
Changlang district

References

Changlang district
Assembly constituencies of Arunachal Pradesh